Alpenus geminipuncta is a moth of the family Erebidae. It was described by George Hampson in 1916. It is found in Ethiopia.

References

Endemic fauna of Ethiopia
Moths described in 1916
Spilosomina
Insects of Ethiopia
Moths of Africa